District 3 of the Turkish State Railways is one of TCDD's 7 districts. The district was formed in 1950, when TCDD split into its original 5 districts. District 3 has three main lines, all starting in İzmir. The İzmir-Bandırma Line, the İzmir-Uşak Line and the İzmir-Denizli Line. There are many branch lines along these lines. District 3 headquarters are located in Alsancak Terminal in İzmir. Major cities such as İzmir, Manisa, Balıkesir, Bandırma, Aydın and Uşak are served.

Rail Lines

Main Lines
Alsancak-Torbalı-Selçuk-Aydın-Nazilli-Goncalı
Basmane-Menemen-Manisa-Alaşehir-Uşak-Dumlupınar
Manisa-Soma-Balıkesir-Bandırma

Branch Lines
Torbalı-Çatal-Ödemiş
Çatal-Tire
Ortaklar-Söke
Goncalı-Denizli
Menemen-Aliağa

Turkish State Railways